Abdullah Ali Ahmed (born 20 December 1961) is a Libyan sprinter. He competed in the men's 200 metres at the 1988 Summer Olympics.

References

External links

1961 births
Living people
Athletes (track and field) at the 1988 Summer Olympics
Libyan male sprinters
Olympic athletes of Libya
Place of birth missing (living people)